Russian convoy may refer to:

 Russian Kyiv Convoy, a vehicle convoy that was part of the 2022 Kyiv offensive
 Arctic convoys of World War II, naval convoys delivering supplies to the northern ports of the Soviet Union during World War II.